Professional Football Club CSKA  (derived from the historical name 'Центральный спортивный клуб армии', English: Central Sports Club of the Army), commonly referred to as CSKA Moscow or CSKA Moskva outside of Russia, or simply as CSKA, is a Russian professional football club. It is based in Moscow, playing its home matches at the 30,000-capacity VEB Arena. It plays in red and blue colours, with various plain and striped patterns having been used.

Founded in 1911, CSKA is one of the oldest football clubs in Russia and it had its most successful period after World War II with five titles in six seasons. It won a total of 7 Soviet Top League championships and 5 Soviet Cups, including the double in the last season in 1991. The club has also won 6 Russian Premier League titles as well as 7 Russian Cups.

CSKA Moscow became the first club in Russia to win one of the European cup competitions, the UEFA Cup, after defeating Sporting CP in the final in Lisbon in 2005.

CSKA was the official team of the Soviet Army during the communist era. Since the dissolution of the Soviet Union it has become privately owned. In 2012, the Ministry of Defence sold all of its shares (24,94%) to Bluecastle Enterprises Ltd, a conglomerate owning 100% of the club since then. On 13 December 2019, state-owned development corporation VEB.RF announced they will take control of over 75% of club shares that were  used as collateral by previous owners for the VEB Arena financing. Russian businessman Roman Abramovich's Sibneft corporation was a leading sponsor of the club from 2004 to 2006.

After the 2022 Russian invasion of Ukraine, the European Club Association suspended the team, along with all Russian club and national teams, from participation in European competition. Due to the Western sanctions the Governmental Investments Bank VEB.RF has sold the club to Trinfico Investments company.

History

Names
CSKA Moscow was founded in 1911 and, like many clubs in the former Soviet Union, has seen a number of name changes. From 1928 to 1950 the association was called CDKA Moscow. In 1951 its name was changed to CDSA Moscow. In 1957 the sports society was renamed again into CSK MO Moscow. The current name of club’s football department, PFC CSKA Moscow has been used since 1994.

 1911–22: Amateur Society of Skiing Sports (OLLS Moscow)
 1923: Experimental & Demonstrational Playground of Military Education Association (OPPV)
 1924–27: Experimental & Demonstrational Playground of Military Administration (OPPV)
 1928–50: Sports Club of Central House of the Red Army (CDKA)
 1951–56: Sports Club of Central House of the Soviet Army (CDSA)
 1957–59: Central Sports Club of the Ministry of Defense (CSK MO)
 1960–: Central Sports Club of Army (CSKA)

Foundation and first successes
The history of CSKA football club began in 1911, when a football section was organized in the Amateur Society of Skiing Sports (OLLS).

After the 1917 season, part of the reserve OLLS team moved to the first.  In 1921, the champion of the autumn Moscow championship (winner of Fulda Cup) was determined in the final match, in which teams OLLS and KFS took part. The KFS team won 6:0. In the 1922 season, OLLS players won the spring Moscow championship and took second place in the fall championship. In the same year, OLLS won KFS-Kolomyagi Cup, in the final of which, according to the regulations, the winners of the first and second leagues of the Moscow championship met, and Tosmen Cup, where the champions of Moscow and Petrograd met.

Soviet period

Until 1970: Peaks and troughs
The club had its most successful period immediately after the end of the Second World War. At this time, one of the best players in its history and the best scorer in the history of the team, Grigory Fedotov, played for the club. The army men were runners-up in the first edition of the resumed Vysschaya Liga in 1945. 
Three consecutive championship titles followed for the first time in league history, including club’s first double in 1948. This year the army team won their second USSR Cup. In the semifinals, as a result of a replay, CDKA snatched victory from Dynamo Moscow, and in the final they defeated the current cup holders, Spartak. After finishing second in 1949, in 1950, the army team became champions again, and in 1951, playing under the new name CDSA (Central House of the Soviet Army), they won a double again, winning both the championship and the cup. The history of the football department from this time is closely linked to the ice hockey department of the club, HC CSKA Moscow, because the leading players like Vsevolod Bobrov played both sports in parallel.

After successful times Olympic Games 1952 in Helsinki marked the beginning of the decline of CDSA Moscow. The club's players formed the core of the national team, which, after tough negotiations, joined FIFA shortly before the Olympic football tournament. Boris Arkadiev became the coach of both the national team and the army club. The first meeting between the Soviet Union and Yugoslavia in football is still amongst the most famous matches. On the political level, the Soviet leader Joseph Stalin and the Yugoslav leader Josip Tito split in 1948, which resulted in Yugoslavia being excluded from the Communist Information Bureau. Before the match, both Tito and Stalin sent telegrams to their national teams, which showed just how important it was for the two head of states. Yugoslavia led 5–1, but a Soviet comeback in the last 15 minutes resulted in a 5–5 draw. The match was replayed, Yugoslavia winning 3–1. The defeat to the archrivals hit Soviet football hard, especially CDSA and its players. After just three games played in the season, CDSA was forced to withdraw from the league and later disbanded. Furthermore, Boris Arkadiev was stripped of his Merited Master of Sports of the USSR title. For intelligence chief Lavrentiy Beria, the Olympic elimination was the perfect opportunity to eliminate the successful city rival.  As head of the KGB, he was also honorary president of Dynamo Moscow - the main rival of CDSA.

After two seasons of oblivion and after Stalin’s death in the spring of 1953 CDSA Moscow was re-established in 1954 on the initiative of then Soviet Defense Minister Nikolai Bulganin. Shortly thereafter, the team won the Soviet Cup in 1955, defeating Dynamo Moscow in the final with the legendary goalkeeper Lev Yashin being sent off. The fans had to wait 15 years for the next trophy.  In 1970 season, CSKA became Soviet champions for the sixth time, gaining the same number of points with Dynamo. The first gold match held on December 5, 1970 in Tashkent, Uzbek SSR ended without goals. The next day CSKA won the second match against Dynamo 4:3 after 1:3 deficit. By winning the championship, CSKA qualified for the first round of the European Cup. CSKA defeated Turkish club Galatasaray in the first round, but lost to Belgian champion Standard Liège in the second round and was eliminated from the tournament.

1971 to 1991: Two decades drought
With only 19 points out of a possible 68 in the 1984 season, the club had to endure the first ever relegation to the second division, where CSKA spent two seasons. After returning to the Higher league, the club did not manage to stay in it for a long time, and in the 1987 season, a second relegation followed. Nevertheless CSKA was able to fight its way back after two seasons in the First League, immediately secured the runner-up and even won the last edition of the football championship of the Soviet Union in the 1991 season. Having also won the Soviet cup, the club thus secured the last golden double in the history of the USSR football. With the championship title from the 1991 season, CSKA Moscow qualified for the first round of the 1992–93 UEFA Champions League, where they defeated the Icelandic team Víkingur Reykjavík. In the second round the Spanish top club Barcelona with coach Johan Cruyff was defeated. The opponents in Group A were the current Champions League winners Olympique Marseille, Glasgow Rangers and Club Brugge. CSKA was unable to build on the results of the matches with Barcelona, becoming the fourth in the group with two draws and four defeats, and was eliminated from the tournament.

Modern period

1992 to 2004: Back to the top
CSKA Moscow was one of the founding members of the newly formed Russian Top Division after the dissolution of the Soviet Union. In the first six seasons, the team occupied the places in the middle of the table. In the 1998 season, the club was runner-up and in the next season finished third. In the following two seasons, CSKA Moscow again occupied places in the middle of the table. In the 2002 season, the team trained by Valery Gazzaev took second place again, winning the Russian Cup. In 2003, the team won its first championship in the history of the Russian Premier League. After that, the head coach Valery Gassayev was sacked surprisingly and the Portuguese coach Artur Jorge was signed as his successor. Under the new coach, the team could not build on the performances from the previous season. After falling to fifth place in July 2004, Arthur Jorge was sacked after only eight months at the helm of the club. After the return of Valery Gassaev, CSKA was able to save the season and become vice-champion.

2005 to 2010: Golden years

In the 2004 season, after qualifying for the UEFA Champions League, the team finished third at the group stage and therefore took part in the UEFA Cup play-off. The UEFA Cup for CSKA began with a home match against Portugal's Benfica in the round of 32, which ended in a 2-0 victory for CSKA, in the away match CSKA drew 1-1. The next rival of CSKA was the Serbian club Partizan, the away match in Belgrade ended with a score of 1-1, and the home match in Krasnodar - 2-0 in favor of the red-blue team. In the next round, the army team defeated the French side Auxerre 4-0. Despite the 2-0 away defeat, CSKA was able to continue playing in the UEFA Cup. In the semifinals, CSKA’s opponent was the Italian side Parma, after beating which (0-0, 3-0), the Muscovites reached the final.

Then, on May 18, 2005, the team became the first Russian team ever to win a European competition, the 2004-05 UEFA Cup at the José Alvalade Stadium in Lisbon, Portugal, winning Sporting 3-1. The team failed to consolidate their success, losing the UEFA Super Cup to English club Liverpool on 26 August 2005 at Stade Louis II, in Monaco. Nevertheless, this year, CSKA become the first Russian club to complete a treble after winning the second Russian championship title and the Russian Cup.

The team had qualified for the third qualifying round of the 2006–07 UEFA Champions League by winning the championship in 2005 and progressed to the group stage over MFK Ružomberok. At the group stage, CSKA finished in third place and qualified for the round of 32 in the UEFA Cup, but was eliminated there against the Israeli representative Maccabi Haifa. In the 2006 season, CSKA won domestic treble, as the team won all three national titles: the Premier League, the Russian Cup and the Russian Super Cup.

As Russian champions, CSKA qualified for the 2007–08 UEFA Champions League. At the group stage, CSKA finished fourth and last with just one draw out of five defeats and was eliminated. In the Premier League, CSKA occupied the third place, but won the Russian Super Cup.

In the first half of the 2008 season, CSKA played below expectations and even finished in seventh place at the break of the season.  After the European Championship, Valery Gazzaev, who announced his retirement at the end of the season, switched the game tactics to four defenders and let the young Alan Dzagoev, who was considered one of the greatest talents in Russian football, show himself. As a result, CSKA ended its negative series and from then on showed effective football. But it was no longer enough to win the championship, and CSKA took the runner-up behind Rubin Kazan. In the 2008-09 UEFA Cup, CSKA was the only team to achieve twelve points from four group matches. Then the team advanced to the round of 16, where they were defeated by the eventual UEFA Cup winners Shakhtar Donetsk from Ukraine after a 1-0 home win and subsequent 0-2 away defeat. The team also won the Russian Cup for the fourth time.

In January 2009, the Brazilian Zico took over the position of head coach at CSKA. After the half of the 2009 season, the club was only fourth. At the end of the 2009 season, fifth place was just enough for participation in the 2010-11 UEFA Europa League. As a result, the Brazilian head coach was dismissed in September 2009.  In the same month, the Spaniard Juande Ramos was signed as his successor, but only lasted 47 days before being released on October 26 and replaced by Leonid Slutsky. The club won the Russian Supercup for the fourth time and became the Russian Cup winner for the fifth time. The team had also qualified for the quarter-finals of the Champions League for the first time after defeating Sevilla FC 3–2 on aggregate. They were later eliminated from competition by the eventual winners Inter Milan, losing by 1–0 scorelines in both Milan and Moscow.

Slutsky era
Leonid Slutsky was introduced as the new head coach in October 2009. In the 2010 Russian Premier League season, the team was runner-up. In the Russian Cup, the team was eliminated in the round of 32 against the second division Ural Ekaterinburg. In the Europa League, CSKA made it to the round of 16, where the team lost to the eventual winners Porto after two defeats (0-1 and 1-2).

Finishing as the runners-up in the previous season, the club qualified for the group stage of the 2011–12 UEFA Champions League. The opponents in Group B were Inter Milan, Trabzonspor and Lille. On 7 December 2011, CSKA qualified for the knockout phase after winning crucial 3 points by defeating Inter Milan with scoreline 1–2 in Milan  and finishing as the runners-up in the group behind the Milanese. In the round of 16 the team met Spanish top club Real Madrid, to which CSKA lost 2-5 on aggregate.  In the 2011–12 Russian championship, CSKA could only reach third place despite finishing second after the first phase of the season. By the 100th anniversary of the club, CSKA could not leave its fans without a trophy and won its sixth Russian Cup, beating Alania Vladikavkaz in the final 2-1 on May 22, 2011.

In the 2012–13 season, CSKA took part in the play-off round of the 2012–13 UEFA Europa League, where they were eliminated against Swedish side AIK after 1-0 in Moscow and 0-2 in Stockholm. At the end of the season, however, CSKA were crowned the champions of Russia. It was the eleventh championship title in club history. The team won the Russian Cup and thus achieving a double.

As Russian champions CSKA took part in the 2013–14 UEFA Champions League. The club was eliminated from the competition after the group stage against Bayern Munich, Manchester City and Viktoria Plzeň with only one win and five defeats resulting in the fourth place. In the domestic League, however, the club celebrated the second championship title in a row after Zoran Tošić scored the decisive goal against Lokomotiv Moscow on the last Matchday of the season for the tenth victory in the league in a row.

In the 2015–16 season, CSKA advanced to the Champions League group stage over Sparta Prague and Sporting.  With PSV Eindhoven, Manchester United and Wolfsburg, CSKA completed Group B of the competition, but wasn’t able to advance to the round of 16. In the Premier League, the club started with six consecutive wins, with the first four games being won without conceding a single goal. At the end of the season, the army club finished two points ahead of the second-placed Rostov and won its sixth Russian title (and 13th overall). 

As a result, CSKA took part in the group stage of the 2016–17 UEFA Champions League. Opponents in Group E were Monaco, Bayer Leverkusen and Tottenham Hotspur. On 6 October 2016, during the group stage,  Finland announced that Roman Eremenko had been handed a 30-day ban from football by UEFA, with UEFA announcing on 18 November 2016, that Eremenko had been handed a two-year ban from football due to testing positive for cocaine.
Following the ban of one of the team leaders CSKA couldn't win a single game and was therefore eliminated from the tournament. After the last group game against Tottenham and after a negative run in the league, longtime head coach Leonid Slutsky left the club at his own request.

On 12 December, Viktor Goncharenko was announced as the club's new manager, signing a two-year contract.

Under Goncharenko
As CSKA finished second in the 2016–17 Premier League, they started their way in the 2017–18 UEFA Champions League from the third qualifying round, defeating AEK Athens there and then Young Boys in the play-off round. In Group A, the army club met Benfica, Manchester United and Basel and finished in third place. As a result, CSKA continued to play in the Europa League and advanced to the quarter-finals, losing to Arsenal.

On 21 July 2018, Goncharenko extended his contract until the end of the 2019/20 season. During the summer of 2018 CSKA lost many of its leaders: Aleksei and Vasili Berezutski and Sergei Ignashevich finished their careers as professional players; Alexandr Golovin was bought by AS Monaco; Pontus Wernbloom became a PAOK player and Bibras Natcho went to Olympiacos. However, at the start of that season CSKA showed good results, being at the top-three in Russian champions table and beating Real Madrid in Champions League group stage in both home and away matches (1–0 in Moscow and 3–0 in Madrid).

On 13 December 2019, state-owned development corporation VEB.RF announced they will take control of over 75% of club shares that were used as collateral by previous owners for the VEB Arena financing.

On 22 March 2021, Viktor Goncharenko left his role as head coach of CSKA Moscow by mutual consent.

Under Olić, Berezutski and Fedotov
On 23 March 2021, CSKA appointed their former striker Ivica Olić as their new head coach. After just nine games, culminating in a 6th place finish in the 2020–21 Russian Premier League, missing the European competitions for the first time in 20 years, Olić left CSKA by mutual consent on 15 June 2021 with Aleksei Berezutski being placed in temporary charge. On 19 July 2021, Berezutski was confirmed as CSKA's new permanent head coach.

In February 2022, CSKA were hit by sanctions from the United States Department of the Treasury as a consequence of the ongoing Russian invasion of Ukraine. CSKA is owned by Russian state-controlled VEB and was sanctioned as its asset. In addition, the European Club Association suspended the team. CSKA won season-best 6 consecutive league games (last two before the winter break and the first four after), Berezutski was selected league's coach of the month for March 2022 and the club moved up to the 3rd position in the standings within 6 points of league-leading Zenit Saint Petersburg. However, CSKA won only twice in the remaining 8 games of the league season and finished in 5th place. On 15 June 2022, Berezutski left his role as Head Coach after his contract was terminated by mutual agreement, with Vladimir Fedotov being appointed as the clubs new Head Coach the same day.

Stadium

CSKA had its own stadium called "Light-Athletic Football Complex CSKA" and abbreviated as LFK CSKA. Its capacity is very small for a club of its stature; no more than 4,600 spectators.

Between 1961 and 2000, CSKA played their home games at the Grigory Fedotov Stadium. In 2007, the Grigory Fedotov Stadium was demolished in 2007, and ground was broken on the club's new stadium Arena CSKA later the same year. During construction of their new stadium, CSKA played the majority of their games at the Arena Khimki and Luzhniki Stadium. After several delays in its construction, Arena CSKA was official opened on 10 September 2016.

On 28 February 2017, CSKA Moscow announced that they had sold the naming rights to the stadium to VEB, with the stadium becoming the VEB Arena.

In 2018, CSKA decided to play its home UEFA Champions League matches at Luzhniki Stadium, instead of VEB Arena.

Honours

Domestic
Soviet Top League / Russian Premier League (First-tier)
Winners (13): 1946, 1947, 1948, 1950, 1951, 1970, 1991, 2003, 2005, 2006, 2012–13, 2013–14, 2015–16
Runners-up (12): 1938, 1945, 1949, 1990, 1998, 2002, 2004, 2008, 2010, 2014–15, 2016–17, 2017–18
Soviet First League / Russian National Football League (Second-tier)
Winners: 1986, 1989
Runners-up: 1985
Soviet Cup / Russian Cup
Winners (12): 1945, 1948, 1951, 1955, 1990–91, 2001–02, 2004–05, 2005–06, 2007–08, 2008–09, 2010–11, 2012–13
Runners-up (7): 1944, 1966–67, 1991–92, 1992–93, 1993–94, 1999–2000, 2015–16
Soviet Super Cup / Russian Super Cup
Winners (7) – (record): 2004, 2006, 2007, 2009, 2013, 2014, 2018
Runners-up (4): 2003, 2010, 2011, 2016
All-Union CPCS Tournament / USSR Federation Cup / Russian Premier League Cup
Winners: 1952

European
UEFA Cup / UEFA Europa League
Winners: 2004–05
UEFA Super Cup
Runners-up: 2005

Non-official
 Trofeo Villa de Gijón: 1
 1994

 Channel One Cup: 1
 2007

 Copa del Sol: 1
 2010

 La Manga Cup: 1
 2013

League and Cup history

Soviet Union

Russia

CSKA in European football

By competition

UEFA club coefficient ranking
. Source: Club coefficients | UEFA Coefficients Players 
 Current squad 

 

Out on loan

 Retired numbers 
 12 – Club supporters (the 12th man)
 16 –  Serhiy Perkhun, goalkeeper (2001) – posthumous honorNotable players
Had international caps for their respective countries. Players whose name is listed in bold represented their countries while playing for CSKA.

USSR/Russia

Former USSR countries

Europe

South America

Africa

Asia

Club officials

Coaching history

Ownerships, kit suppliers and shirt sponsors

Supporters and rivalries

CSKA Moscow fans maintain good relations with the fans of Serbian Partizan, Greek PAOK FC, Polish Widzew Łódź and fellow Russian fans of Dynamo Moscow.
The Club’s main rival is Spartak Moscow.

Nickname
CSKA was nicknamed Horses because the first stadium was built on the old racecourse/hippodromo in Moscow. It was considered offensive, but later it was transformed into The Horses, and currently this nickname is used by players and fans as the name, along with other variants such as Army Men and Red-Blues''.

Famous fans

 Alexander Babakov
 Matvey Blanter
 Aleksey Buldakov
 Igor Butman
 Semyon Farada
 Oleg Gazmanov
 Andrei Grechko
 Sergei Ivanov
 Konstantin Kinchev
 Leonid Kuravlyov
 Otar Kushanashvili
 Denis Lebedev
 Yegor Letov
 Oleg Menshikov
 Aleksey Merinov
 Maya Plisetskaya
 Aleksandr Porokhovshchikov
 Natalya Seleznyova
 Maksim Shevchenko
 Mikhail Tanich
 Natalya Varley
 Vladimir Vysotsky
 Sergei Yastrzhembsky
 Mikhail Youzhny
 Vladimir Zeldin

Club records

Appearances

1

Top goalscorers

1

CSKA Women

CSKA's women's football team was founded in 1990 and competed in Soviet Championship's second level. Following the dissolution of the Soviet Union that same year, it registered in the Russian Supreme Division, where it competed for two seasons before it folded.

Following the disbanding of Zorky Krasnogorsk near the end of the 2015 Top Division, FK Rossiyanka filled its vacancy for the next season and the new team was registered as CSKA in the 2016 championship. Its first game, a 1–1 draw against Chertanovo, coincided with the 93rd anniversary of the CSKA's first football match. CSKA ended the championship second-to-last, while Rossiyanka won its fifth title.

In July 2017, during the inter-season summer pause, it became a CSKA official section. Two months later the team won its first title after defeating Chertanovo 1–0 in the Russian Cup final.

In recent years CSKA Women won two Russian championships in a row, in 2019 and 2020 and made their debut in UEFA Women's Champions League.

FC CSKA-d Moscow and FC CSKA-2 Moscow
The reserves team played on the professional level as FC CSKA-d Moscow (Russian Second League in 1992–93, Russian Third League in 1994–97, Russian Second Division in 1998–00, in 1998–00 team was called FC CSKA-2 Moscow). A separate farm club called FC CSKA-2 Moscow played in the Soviet Second League in 1986–89, Soviet Second League B in 1990–91, Russian Second League in 1992–93 and Russian Third League in 1994. That latter team was called FC Chaika-CSKA-2 Moscow for one season in 1989.

Notes

References

Bibliography
 Marc Bennetts, 'Football Dynamo – Modern Russia and the People's Game,' Virgin Books, (March 2009), 0753513196

External links

 CSKA is the leader among the RPL clubs  
 Official website 
 Fans site CSKA 
 Peski 

 
Association football clubs established in 1911
Football clubs in Moscow
1911 establishments in the Russian Empire
Military association football clubs in Russia
FC
Soviet Top League clubs
Russian entities subject to the U.S. Department of the Treasury sanctions
UEFA Cup winning clubs